Schönhagen may refer to:

Germany
Schönhagen, Thuringia, in the Eichsfeld district, Thuringia
 , in the Teltow-Fläming district, Brandenburg
A locality in Uslar, Lower Saxony
A locality in Brodersby, Rendsburg-Eckernförde, Schleswig-Holstein
Schönhagen Airport, Brandenburg

Poland
the former German name of Osina, Goleniów County, Poland